Dylan Kennett (born 8 December 1994) is a New Zealand professional racing cyclist, who currently rides for UCI Continental team . Of Māori descent, Kennett affiliates to the Ngāi Tahu iwi.

Kennett rode at the 2015 UCI Track Cycling World Championships, winning gold in the team pursuit. Alongside Pieter Bulling, Aaron Gate, and Regan Gough, he came fourth in the men's team pursuit at the 2016 Rio Olympics, being beaten by Denmark to the bronze medal.

Major results

2013
 1st Six Days of Fiorenzuola (with Shane Archbold)
2015
 1st  Team pursuit, UCI Track World Championships
 2nd Time trial, National Road Championships
2017
 2nd  Team pursuit, UCI Track World Championships
2018
 Tour de Poyang Lake
1st Stages 2, 6 & 11
 3rd  Individual pursuit, Commonwealth Games
 6th Overall Tour of Taihu Lake
1st Prologue & Stage 4
2019
 1st  Overall Tour of Taihu Lake
1st Points classification
1st Stage 3
2020
 New Zealand Cycle Classic
1st Points classification
1st Stage 5
 National Road Championships
3rd Road race
3rd Time trial

References

External links

1994 births
Living people
New Zealand male cyclists
Cyclists from Christchurch
Cyclists at the 2016 Summer Olympics
Olympic cyclists of New Zealand
Ngāi Tahu people
New Zealand Māori sportspeople
Commonwealth Games medallists in cycling
Commonwealth Games bronze medallists for New Zealand
Cyclists at the 2018 Commonwealth Games
New Zealand track cyclists
Medallists at the 2018 Commonwealth Games